"A Little Less Talk And A Lot More Action" is a song written by Keith Hinton and Jimmy Alan Stewart. Originally recorded by American country music singer Hank Williams Jr. on his 1992 album Maverick, the song was also recorded by Toby Keith one year later on his self-titled debut album. Keith's version was released in November 1993 as that album's third single. Also, it reached number 2 on the U.S. Billboard Hot Country Singles & Tracks (now Hot Country Songs) chart and peaked at number 25 on the Canadian RPM charts.

Music video
The music video for this song features Keith performing this song in concert,  at a bar, with a band. It was directed by Michael Merriman. The video was shot at a bar called Chastain's in Oklahoma City Oklahoma and features the original members of Toby Keith's Easy Money Band.

Chart performance
"A Little Less Talk And A Lot More Action" debuted at number 66 on the country chart dated November 13, 1993. It charted for twenty weeks on that chart, and peaked at number 2 on the country chart dated February 19, 1994, behind John Michael Montgomery's "I Swear".

Year-end charts

References

1992 songs
1993 singles
Hank Williams Jr. songs
Toby Keith songs
Song recordings produced by Harold Shedd
Mercury Records singles